Hannah Priest (born 16 May 1992) is an Australian rules footballer who plays for St Kilda in the AFL Women's (AFLW). It was revealed Priest had signed on with the Saints for two more years on 30 June 2021, tying her to the club until the end of the 2022/2023 season. After serving as co-captain during the 2021 season, Priest was named the Saints' sole captain in November 2021.

References

External links

 

Living people
1992 births
St Kilda Football Club (AFLW) players
Australian rules footballers from South Australia
Sportswomen from South Australia